Mile Janakieski is a Republic of Macedonia politician. He served as Minister of Transport and Communications in the cabinet of Prime Minister Nikola Gruevski until 12 May 2015.

Biography
In fall 2009 Janakieski offered his resignation to Prime Minister Gruevski after the 2009 Lake Ohrid boat accident. Gruevski however refused to accept.

He resigned in the wake of the 2015 Macedonian protests, citing the political crisis as reason for his resignation. Prime Minister Gruevski praised Janakieski for liberalizing the telecom market, reducing phone and data costs, the started construction of three highways and a railway to Bulgaria. Janakieski was succeeded as Minister by Vlado Misajlovski on 13 May 2015. On 12 February 2016, the special prosecution for organized criminal in Skopje lifted accusation against Mile Janakieski and 8 other persons for falsifying elections and criminal association.

References

Living people
Year of birth missing (living people)
Government ministers of North Macedonia